Scuba Schools International (SSI) is a for-profit organization that teaches the skills involved in scuba diving and freediving, and supports dive businesses and resorts. SSI has over 2,500 authorized dealers, 35 regional centers, and offices all over the world.

History 
SSI was founded by Robert Clark in 1970. SSI headquarters are in Fort Collins, Colorado, and it is owned by Concept Systems International, Inc. In 2008, it was acquired by Doug McNeese, owner of the National Association of Scuba Diving Schools (USA) until its merger with SSI in 1999, and Robert Stoss, manager of Scubapro and Seemann Sub.  On January 1, 2014, SSI was acquired by HEAD, which also includes the Mares brand of diving equipment, HEAD NV, for €4.9m.

Training 
SSI offers internationally recognized recreational diver training programs - starting with snorkeling and entry level scuba diving courses up to instructor certifications. The most common programs are: SSI Open Water Diver (OWD) and Advanced Open Water Diver (AOWD). There are more than 30 different specialty courses. Dive leader training programs start with the Dive Control Specialist (who is qualified like Assistant Instructor) followed by Open Water Instructor and above. SSI's training program for children aged 8–12 years is called Scuba Rangers. The training program for technical divers is called TechXR (Technical Extended Range) and includes decompression diving, trimix and other courses that exceed the limit for recreational divers.

SSI scuba certifications are recognized throughout the world (such as RSTC - Recreational Scuba Training Council, EUF - European Underwater Federation, CUA - China Underwater Association and others).

The main difference to other dive training organizations is that SSI instructors are only allowed to teach at SSI Dive Centers or SSI accredited dive clubs that adopt a franchise-like concept.

SSI is a member of the following councils of the World Recreational Scuba Training Council -  the United States RSTC, the RSTC Europe and C-Card Council (Japan). It is also a member of the European Underwater Federation. SSI obtained CEN certification from the EUF certification body in 2005.  It received ISO certification on June 1, 2010.

Programs, certification and progression 

The SSI Training Standards outline the offered programs, their prerequisites and certification progression.

Non-certification programs
Try Scuba

Entry-level scuba diving certification
In addition to the industry standard Open Water Diver (including Junior Open Water Diver for under 15s) qualification, SSI offers the following (which can be upgraded to Open Water certification with some additional training).

Basic Diver (ISO 11121)
Referral Diver
Indoor Diver
Scuba Diver (ISO 24801-1) (including Junior Scuba Diver for under 15s)

The Open Water Diver complies with Autonomous diver, ISO 24801-2. The Autonomous diver level is variously described as the best, and most popular, introductory scuba qualification.

Progression beyond Open Water
After Open Water certification, progression mainly depends on completing Scuba Specialty Programs and logging certain numbers of dives.

Advance Adventurer: a program of five adventure dives and an introduction to the theory of 12 specialties. Considered equivalent to PADI's Advanced Open Water certificate.
Specialty Diver: automatically awarded upon completion of 12 logged dives and two specialty programs.
Advanced Open Water Diver: automatically awarded upon completion of 24 logged dives and four specialty programs. 
Diver Stress & Rescue: special training to recognize and handle with stress, prevent accidents and act correctly in an emergency. Considered equivalent to PADI's Rescue Diver program. 
Master Diver: the highest recreational rating, automatically awarded after completing four specialties, Diver Stress and Rescue, and 50 logged dives.

Scuba specialty programs
Below are some of the speciality courses that can be completed as part of the above certifications.

Altitude diver - planning, procedures and equipment for diving at altitudes above  with reference to the modified decompression procedures required.
Boat diving - boat diving techniques, choosing a travel agency and diving operator and what equipment to take when travelling.
Deep diving - planning and conducting recreational dives below 
Underwater photography - introduction to underwater photography, using a digital camera system, composition and editing of underwater photos
Diver stress and rescue - how to avoid, recognize and deal with problems on the surface and underwater.
Dry suit diving - advantages of dry suit diving, types of suits, valves, underwear and accessories, dry suit diving techniques and suit maintenance
EAN Nitrox -  planning dives with Nitrox and using Nitrox safely, including analyzing the mix before use.
Equipment techniques - choice of diving equipment to suit needs, and how to fit, adjust, maintain and make minor repairs to equipment.
Navigation - using a compass and using environmental clues, how to estimate distances, navigate search patterns, find waypoints, and return to the exit point.
Night and limited visibility - comparison of night and limited visibility diving, preparing for the dive, and the appropriate equipment and procedures.
Perfect buoyancy - understanding the principles of buoyancy control and applying them in the water to reduce diver impact on the environment.
Recreational sidemount diving - background, history, benefits and equipment of sidemount diving and how to configure the equipment and manage it in the water.
River diving - peculiarities of diving in rivers, identifying and assessing hazards an how to manage river diving equipment.
Science of diving -  physics, physiology, decompression theory, marine life and diving equipment.
Search and recovery - various search patterns using ropes and compasses, planning of search and recovery operations in a team, and the correct handling of lifting bags.
Shark ecology - biology, ecology and identification of sharks, and procedures for diving with sharks.
Waves, tides and currents - basics concepts of waves, tides and currents, and suitable equipment and procedures for diving in them from the shore and from boats.
Wreck diving - how to get information on wrecks, to locate them, to prepare for a wreck dive, use appropriate wreck diving techniques, and identify and avoid hazards while diving on wrecks.

Freediving programs

Try Freediving
Basic Freediving
Freediving Level 1 & Pool
Freediving Level 2
Freediving Level 3
Freediving Specialty Programs such as:
No-Fins Freediving
Monofin Freediving
Free Immersion
Training Tables

Professional diving certifications
The SSI Training Standards outline the professional qualifications and progression.

Dive Guide (Dive leader, ISO 24801-3): prerequisites are certification for the specialities of Navigation, Deep Diving, and Night & Limited Visibility, plus Diver Stress & Rescue and 40 logged dives totaling at least 25 hours. To qualify, requires training, exams, and logging at least 50 open water dives totaling 32 hours.
Divemaster: awarded to certified Dive Guides completing the Science of Diving speciality and logging 60 open water dives totaling at least 40 hours. 
Snorkel Instructor (ISO 13970) 
Assistant Instructor (Level 1 instructor, ISO 24802-1): prerequisite Divemaster.
Open Water Instructor (Level 2 instructor, ISO 24802-2): prerequisite Divemaster. The qualified instructor can teach courses up to the level of Dive Guide.

Advanced Open Water Instructor (AOWI = OWI + 4 Specialty Instructor ratings {including Diver Stress and Rescue} + issued 15 certifications at a level higher than Open Water Diver)
Divemaster Instructor (DMI = AOWI + Science of Diving Instructor + issued 30 certifications in different programs)
Assistant Instructor Trainer (AIT)
Master Instructor (MI = AIT + 250 dives + issued 150 certifications in different levels)
Instructor Trainer
Instructor Certifier

Advanced diving certifications

Extended Range certifications
XR Nitrox Diver
XR Advanced Wreck Diver
XR Cavern Diver
XR Sidemount Diving
XR Gas Blender

Technical Extended Range certifications
XR Extended Range Foundations
XR Extended Range / XR Extended Range Limited Trimix
XR Technical Extended Range Diver / XT Technical Extended Range Trimix Diver
XR Hypoxic Trimix Diver
XR Technical Wreck Diver
XR Cave Diver
XR Full Cave Diver

Professional certifications
XR Nitrox Instructor
XR Extended Range Instructor
XR Cavern Diving Instructor
XR Advanced Wreck Diving Instructor
XR Technical Extended Range Instructor
XR Hypoxic Trimix Diving Instructor
XR Technical Wreck Diving Instructor
XR Cave Diving Instructor
XR Full Cave Diving Instructor
XR Gas Blender Instructor
XR Nitrox Instructor Trainer
XR Extended Range Instructor Trainer 
XR Technical Extended Range Instructor Trainer 
XR Hypoxic Trimix Instructor Trainer
XR International Training Director

See also

References

External links
Official SSI website
MySSI App

Underwater diving training organizations